Countess of Lincoln is a title that may be held by a female in her own right or given to the wife of the Earl of Lincoln. Those who have held the title include:

Countesses of Lincoln in their own right
Hawise of Chester, 1st Countess of Lincoln (1180-1243)
Margaret de Quincy, Countess of Lincoln (c.1206-1266)
Alice de Lacy, 4th Countess of Lincoln (1281-1348)

Countesses of Lincoln by marriage
Elizabeth FitzGerald, Countess of Lincoln (1527-1590)
Elizabeth Clinton, Countess of Lincoln (née Knyvet; c.1570-1638)
Bridget Clinton, Countess of Lincoln (17th century; exact dates unknown)